Ring settlements may refer to:
 Ring settlements around a major city
 Ring Neighborhoods, Jerusalem
 Smolensk Ring